This list of fictional cats in literature is subsidiary to the list of fictional cats. It is restricted solely to notable feline characters from notable literary works of fiction. For characters that appear in several separate works, only the earliest work will be recorded here.

Named

Unnamed

See also
List of fictional cats
List of individual cats

References

 
Literature
Cats
Fictional cats in literature